Walter Frederick Victor Sykes (2 May 1881 - 4 October 1967) was an Australian rules footballer who played with Collingwood and Melbourne in the Victorian Football League (VFL).

Notes

External links 

1881 births
1967 deaths
Australian rules footballers from Victoria (Australia)
Collingwood Football Club players
Melbourne Football Club players